Oum Ali District is a district of Tébessa Province, Algeria.

During the Arab Spring of 2011, Oum Ali District was home to hundreds of Tunisian refugee dissidents.

Districts of Tébessa Province